The Ukrainian Basketball SuperLeague (USL) is the first-tier level of professional basketball league in Ukraine. Established in 1992, the league is currently contested by 10 clubs. It is a tier above the Ukrainian Higher League and allows for one team from the Higher League each season to be promoted.

The league exists out of a regular season, in which team play for playoff-seeding, followed by playoffs to determine the Ukrainian champion. Budivelnyk is the most successful team in league history with 10 titles. The winners of the Superleague qualify for the qualifying rounds of the Basketball Champions League (BCL).

2020–21 season

Teams
11 teams are in the competition. Ternopil is new team in the league.

Champions

 Note, there were two different leagues in the 2008–09 and 2015–16 season. 
 FBU-sanctioned league seasons marked in light green. Alternative non-FBU league seasons marked in light blue.

Performance by club

 Superleague clubs marked with light green background.
 Low division clubs marked with light yellow background.
 Defunct clubs marked with light grey background.

Individual awards

Most Valuable Player

See also
 Ukrainian Basketball League
 Ukrainian SL Favorit Sport
 Ukrainian Basketball Cup
 Ukrainian Basketball Federation

References

External links
 Official Ukrainian Basketball Federation 
 Ukrainian SuperLeague on Eurobasket.com 

 
Basketball leagues in Ukraine
Basketball
Professional sports leagues in Ukraine